Non-specific lipid-transfer protein also known as sterol carrier protein 2 (SCP-2) or propanoyl-CoA C-acyltransferase is a protein that in humans is encoded by the SCP2 gene.

Function 

This gene encodes two proteins: sterol carrier protein X (SCPx) and sterol carrier protein 2 (SCP2), as a result of transcription initiation from 2 independently regulated promoters. The transcript initiated from the proximal promoter encodes the longer SCPx protein, and the transcript initiated from the distal promoter encodes the shorter SCP2 protein, with the 2 proteins sharing a common C-terminus. Evidence suggests that the SCPx protein is a peroxisome-associated thiolase that is involved in the oxidation of branched chain fatty acids, while the SCP2 protein is thought to be an intracellular lipid transfer protein.  Alternative splicing of this gene produces multiple transcript variants, some encoding different isoforms. The full-length nature of all transcript variants has not been determined.

Clinical significance 

This gene is highly expressed in organs involved in lipid metabolism, and may play a role in Zellweger syndrome, in which cells are deficient in peroxisomes and have impaired bile acid synthesis.

Interactions
SCP2 has been shown to interact with Caveolin 1 and peroxisomal receptor PEX5.

References

Further reading

EC 2.3.1